Easy Touch is a cover album released by Mary Wells on 51 West Records. After the commercial failure of her previous album, In and Out of Love, Epic Records relegated her to the 51 West subsidiary to finish the rest of her contract with them. The album included covers of hits by Frankie Lymon, Stevie Wonder, Melissa Manchester, the Carpenters and Donna Summer. The album, like her previous, was a commercial failure and no singles were released to promote it.

Track listing
 "Boy from New York City" – 3:16
 "Slow Hand" – 3:45
 "Why Do Fools Fall in Love" – 2:57
 "Reunited" – 4:04
 "If You Really Love Me" – 3:06
 "Fame" – 3:53
 "Don't Cry Out Loud" – 3:58
 "Dim All the Lights" – 4:00
 "Touch Me When We're Dancing" – 3:17
 "I've Never Been to Me – 3:26

References

1982 albums
Mary Wells albums
Covers albums
Sony Music albums